Charles T. Perry (January 10, 1812 - January 9, 1872) was an American politician who served as the seventh Mayor of Hoboken, New Jersey, from 1864 to 1865. Perry was a Whig in 1852, but was the Democratic nominee for City Treasurer in 1858 when George W. Morton ran for mayor. He was President of the Hudson County Gaslight Company and a director of the First National Bank of Hoboken.

Biography
He was born on January 10, 1812, in Massachusetts to George Perry. On December 13, 1838, in Sandwich, Massachusetts, he married Caroline Goodson.

He served as the seventh mayor of Hoboken, New Jersey, from 1864 to 1865	

By 1867 he was president of the Hudson County Gaslight Company and a director of the First National Bank of Hoboken.

Perry died of a self-inflicted gunshot to the head at 11:00 pm on January 9, 1872.

References

1812 births
1872 deaths
19th-century American politicians
American politicians who committed suicide
Mayors of Hoboken, New Jersey
New Jersey Democrats
New Jersey Whigs
Suicides by firearm in New Jersey
1870s suicides